Altun may refer to:
 Altun-e Olya
 Altun-e Sofla